Coolaney/Mullinabreena is a Gaelic Athletic Association club based in the parishes of Killoran/Coolaney and Achonry/Mullinabreena in County Sligo, Republic of Ireland.

The club has links to Nace O'Dowd and its home ground, which opened in 1994, is named after him.

Honours
 Sligo Senior Football Championship: (1)
 1958
 Sligo Intermediate Football Championship: (2)
 2005, 2011
 Sligo Junior Football Championship: (5)
 1910, 1957, 1968, 1984, 1988
 Sligo Under 20 Football Championship: (2)
 1992, 1993 (as St Nathy's, amalgamated with Bunninadden)
 Sligo Minor Football Championship: (2)
 1957, 2010
 Sligo Junior Football League (Division 5): (1)
 1984
 Benson Cup: (1)
 1991

References

Gaelic games clubs in County Sligo